Sisai is one of the biggest villages in Bihar. It comes under Siwan District, India, located about 42 km by road and 52 km by train route north (U.P. border, absolute corner of Chhapra, Gopalganj and Siwan Districts) of the Chhapra. It is a typical village of Bihar. From September to April, a blanket is necessary during nights. It is the biggest village in Siwan. It has 51 tola. It comes under Goriyakothi Police Station and Sisai Panchayat. There is a famous middle school which built in 1916. It is bounded by Chhitaouli from north, Bishunpur from South, Angya from East and Pahlegpur from West.

In the 2011 census, there were 1877 families with population of 11892 of which 5633 were females while 6259 were males. The population of children age 0-6 was 2202 which was 18.52% of total population. Average sex ratio of Sisai village was 1111 which is higher than Bihar state average of 918. Child sex ratio for the Sisai in the census was 954, higher than Bihar average of 935.

Sisai village has higher literacy rate compared to other villages and average rate of Bihar. In 2011, literacy rate of Sisai village was 66.08% compared to 61.80% of Bihar. In Sisai Male literacy stands at 78.54% while female literacy rate was 55.25%.

As per constitution of India and Panchyati Raaj Act, Sisai village is administrated by Sarpanch (Head of Village) who is elected representative of village.

Caste Factor
Schedule Caste (SC) constitutes 7.72% while Schedule Tribe (ST) were 0.01% of total population in Sisai village.

Sisai Data

Particulars	Total	Male	Female
Total No. of Houses	1,877	-	-
Population	11,892	6,259	5,633
Child (0-6)	2,202	1,127	1,075
Schedule Caste	918	444	474
Schedule Tribe	1	0	1
Literacy 66.08% 78.54% 55.25%
Total Workers	3,602	2,306	1,296
Main Worker	1,616	0	0
Marginal Worker	1,986	1,011	975

Villages in Saran district